Lyncina kuroharai is a species of sea snail, a cowry, a marine gastropod mollusk in the family Cypraeidae, the cowries.

References

Cypraeidae
Gastropods described in 1961